Buronga is a town in Sudan.

References

Populated places in Central Darfur